Masks (German: Masken) is a 1929 German silent crime film directed by Rudolf Meinert and starring Karl Ludwig Diehl, Trude Berliner and Marcella Albani. It was the second film made by Meinert featuring the detective hero Stuart Webbs following The Green Monocle (1929). It was shot at the Grunewald Studios in Berlin. The film's sets were designed by the art director Hermann Warm.

Cast
 Karl Ludwig Diehl as Stuart Webbs 
 Trude Berliner as Mary 
 Marcella Albani as Elyane 
 Charles Willy Kayser as Bankier Clifford 
 Hans Schickler as Jankins 
 Jean Murat as Jonny 
 Betty Astor as Goldelse 
 Borwin Walth as Kommissar Black 
 Gerhard Dammann as Wirt Pitt 
 Oskar Homolka as Breitkopf 
 Robert Klein-Lörk as Charly

References

Bibliography
 Prawer, S.S. Between Two Worlds: The Jewish Presence in German and Austrian Film, 1910–1933. Berghahn Books, 2007.

External links

1929 films
German crime films
German silent feature films
Films of the Weimar Republic
Films directed by Rudolf Meinert
Films based on German novels
1920s crime films
German black-and-white films
1930s German films
1920s German films